Príncipe is the smaller of the two major islands of São Tomé and Príncipe lying off the west coast of Africa.

Principe may refer to:
 Il Principe, a political treatise
 Principe (surname), an Italian surname
 Principe (Genoa Metro), Italy, a station

Príncipe may refer to:
 Príncipe Province, São Tomé and Príncipe
 Príncipe (Ceuta), Spain
 Castle del Príncipe (Havana), a colonial castle in Havana, Cuba
 Pedrosa del Príncipe, a municipality of Castile and León, Spain
 Puebla del Príncipe, a municipality in Castile - La Mancha, Spain 
 La Revancha Del Príncipe Charro,  the second album released by the Mexican band Panda

See also
Casita del Príncipe (disambiguation)
El Príncipe (disambiguation)